Gáspár Heltai (born as Kaspar Helth) (c. 1490–1574) was a Transylvanian Saxon writer and printer. His name possibly derives from the village Heltau (today Cisnădie, Romania). Despite being a German native speaker he published many books in Hungarian from his print-shop. The brother of his son-in-law was Ferenc Dávid, Nontrinitarian and Unitarian preacher and the founder of the Unitarian Church of Transylvania.

Career
He studied at Wittenberg University and he established the first print shop in Kolozsvár  (now Cluj-Napoca, Romania). He also founded a public bath, a paper mill and the first brewery in the town. He was at the same time a pastor, translator, printer, publisher, writer and businessman. He is considered the first religious reformer of  Kolozsvár.
He was a great spirit of Hungarian Unitarian Reformation. Together with a group of scholars he produced an almost complete translation of the New Testament into Hungarian.  His work marked the first buds of a secular literature in Hungary.

Bonfini translation
Heltai's most voluminous work is his reworking and translation of Antonio Bonfini's Rerum Hungaricum Decades ("Ten Volumes of Hungarian Matters"), which Heltai published in 1575 as Chronica az magyaroknak dolgairól ("Chronicle of the Hungarians’ Past Deeds"). The work was printed in Kolozsvár (Cluj-Napoca).

References

Relevant literature
Forgács-Drahota, Erzsébet (2000) Sprichwörter in den Werken von Gáspár Heltai. Acta Ethnographica Hungarica, 45 (3-4). pp. 337–357. ISSN 1216-9803

External links
 
The text of the New Testament translation of Heltai in its original orthographic form is available and searchable in the Old Hungarian Corpus.

16th-century Hungarian historians
16th-century printers
Hungarian Unitarians
Translators of the Bible into Hungarian
Translators to Hungarian
Hungarian writers
Hungarian chroniclers
Hungarian-German people
Transylvanian Saxon people
University of Wittenberg alumni
Hungarian expatriates in Germany
People from Sibiu County
1490 births
1574 deaths
16th-century businesspeople of the Holy Roman Empire